Trypetesidae is a family of crustaceans belonging to the order Lithoglyptida.

Genera:
 Tomlinsonia Turquier, 1985
 Trypetesa Norman, 1903

References

Maxillopoda
Crustacean families
Taxa named by Thomas Roscoe Rede Stebbing
Crustaceans described in 1910